Hypoecta is a genus of picture-winged flies in the family Ulidiidae.

Species
 H. longula

References

Ulidiidae